Les films du losange is a film production company founded by Barbet Schroeder and Éric Rohmer in 1962. The company funds and distributes many films from the French nouvelle vague era, directed by Rohmer, Schroeder, Roger Planchon, Jacques Rivette, and later on Michael Haneke and Jacques Doillon.

In January 2022, Les films du losange acquired the catalogue of French director Jean Eustache.

Partial filmography

References

External links 
 Official website

Éric Rohmer
Film production companies of France
Mass media companies established in 1962
1962 establishments in France
International sales agents